Carlton is a city in Yamhill County, Oregon,  United States. The population was 2,135 as of the 2020 Census.

History

The origin of Carlton's name is disputed. An ex-county commissioner claims that the name was derived from Wilson Carl, whereas A. E. Bones, postmaster at Carlton, stated in a 1925 letter that it was named for John Carl, Sr., at the request of R. R. Thompson. These men may have been part of the same family.

Carlton post office was established in 1874, with F. J. Fryer serving as its first postmaster.

Actual history of Carlton, Oregon:
Prior to the post office inside the city of Carlton, Wilson Carl owned the original Post Office, Stagecoach stop, and Blacksmith shop for the area, about 7 miles West of Carlton, and his home was known as Mountain House.  Wilson Carl was the original postmaster. Wilson Carl traveled with Dr. Joel Knight on the Oregon Trail to the area, as witnessed in the diary of Amelia Stewart Knight.  Wilson Carl negotiated with the railroad in Portland, Oregon, to build closer to his property. Since the original plot was over the mountain West of Carlton, it was a matter of convenience for the railroad to build where it presently is, because negotiating the mountain was not feasible.  The population of Carlton expanded to become the city of Carlton, around the railroad.  The city is named after Wilson Carl, and was originally called Carl's town.  A few other variations of his name were used before the name became Carlton.  Wilson Carl began as a pioneer carpenter/builder and shoemaker who became a wealthy land owner, who built a portion of what is now Linfield College, in McMinnville, and was founder of the Republican Party in McMinnville, County Commissioner, and, at one time owned the property that the Yamhill County Courthouse presently sits on.  The original post office still exists on his original homestead and plot of land, though it has since been used as a residence for his heirs and is currently unoccupied.  There is further information about the name variations used for Carlton, in a former Oregon Blue Book.

Geography

Demographics

2020
As of the 2020 census, there were 2,135 people, 745 households. The racial makeup of the city was 84% White, 0% African American, 1% Native American, 3% Asian, and 2% from two or more races. Hispanic or Latino of any race were 8% of the population.

There were 745 households, of which 23% had children under the age of 18 living with them, 65% were married couples living together, 23% had a female householder with no spouse present, 4% had a male householder with no spouse present, and 8% were non-families. The average household size was 2.9

The median age in the city was 40.1 years. 23% of residents were under the age of 18; 60% were between the ages of 18 and 64; and 18% were 65 years of age or older. The gender makeup of the city was 51% those who identify as female and 49% those who identify as male.

Education
Residents are zoned to the Yamhill Carlton School District, headquartered in Yamhill.

Yamhill-Carlton Elementary School (YCES) is located in Carlton, and Yamhill-Carlton Intermediate School (YCIS) and Yamhill-Carlton High School (YCHS) are in Yamhill.

Notable people
Matt Marshall, golfer
Peter Broderick, musician

Things to do 

 Carlton History Tour: Download the app onto your phone and enjoy over 20 stops. 
 Wine Tasting: Carlton is referred to as the wine capital of Oregon. There are nearly two dozen tasting rooms in Carlton alone, representing all regions of Oregon viticulture, and other wineries in the surrounding hills. 
 Carlton Fun Days: This annual June event features local vendors, food, and fun.

References

External links
Entry for Carlton in the Oregon Blue Book

1874 establishments in Oregon
Populated places established in 1874
Cities in Oregon
Cities in Yamhill County, Oregon
Portland metropolitan area